Jürgen Dietze (born 16 September 1942, in Leipzig) is a German former swimmer who competed in the 1960 Summer Olympics and in the 1964 Summer Olympics.

References

1942 births
Living people
German male swimmers
Male backstroke swimmers
Olympic swimmers of the United Team of Germany
Swimmers at the 1960 Summer Olympics
Swimmers at the 1964 Summer Olympics
Swimmers from Leipzig
European Aquatics Championships medalists in swimming
20th-century German people
21st-century German people